Dauphin is a provincial electoral division in the Canadian province of Manitoba.  It was originally created in 1881 with the expansion of the province's western boundary, eliminated in 1886, re-established in 1892, and finally abolished in 1999.  Most of its territory went to the new riding of Dauphin-Roblin, though a small amount went to the riding of Swan River. Dauphin-Roblin was largely replaced by a new Dauphin riding in the 2008 redistribution, expanding to include Ste. Rose du Lac.

Dauphin was initially centred on the community of Dauphin, Manitoba, though it now encompasses much rural territory as well.  It is located in the province's mid-northern region, close to the provincial border with Saskatchewan.

List of provincial representatives

Electoral results

1881 by-election

1883 general election

1892 general election

1896 general election

1899 general election

1903 general election

1907 general election

1910 general election

1914 general election

1915 general election

1920 general election

1922 general election

1927 general election

1932 general election

1936 general election

1941 general election

1945 general election

1949 general election

1953 general election

1958 general election

1959 general election

1962 general election

1966 general election

1969 general election

1973 general election

1977 general election

1981 general election

1986 general election

1988 general election

1990 general election

1995 general election

1999 general election

2003 general election

2007 general election

2011 general election

2016 general election

2019 general election

References

Dauphin, Manitoba
Manitoba provincial electoral districts